Hellbassbeaters is the debut album by Helloween bassist Markus Grosskopf's bass guitar-based heavy metal side project Bassinvaders. The album was released on 25 January 2008 in Germany.

The album is a distinctive piece of experimental music which features no guitars at all. Instead, it features lead solo bass guitars, rhythm bass guitars and actual bass guitars who play the bass parts, along with accompanying vocals and drums.
Most notably, the album features the Bassinvaders' rendition of Helloween's popular song "Eagle Fly Free".

Also, the album features a wide range of guest bassists who play the bass solos and add to the variety of the album. Those include Billy Sheehan (Mr. Big, Steve Vai), Rudy Sarzo (Dio, Quiet Riot), Jan S. Eckert (Masterplan), Tobias Exxel (Edguy), Marco Mendoza (Blue Murder, Whitesnake), Nibbs Carter (Saxon) and more.

Track listing

Personnel 

 Bassinvaders
Markus Grosskopf – bass guitar
Marcel Schirmer – vocals, bass guitar
Tom Angelripper – vocals, bass guitar
Peter "Peavy" Wagner – vocals, bass guitar

 Guest musicians
Bass guitar
Billy Sheehan
Rudy Sarzo
Lee Rocker
Marco Mendoza
D.D. Verni
Wyzard
Dirk Schlächter
Joey Vera
Stig Pedersen
Nibbs Carter
Tobias Exxel
Jens Becker
Dennis Ward
Peter Baltes
Jan S. Eckert
Michael Mueller
Vocals
Apollo Papathanasio
Jesper Binzer
Drums
André Hilgers
Stefan Arnold

2008 debut albums
Bassinvaders albums